Weighted Mind is a country and bluegrass album by Sierra Hull. It earned her a Grammy Award nomination for Best Folk Album in December 2016. The spartan arrangements center on Hull's vocals and mandolin accompanied by Ethan Jodziewicz on double bass, with occasional backing vocals by Alison Krauss, Abigail Washburn, and Rhiannon Giddens. The album was produced by Béla Fleck.

Track listing

Personnel
 Sierra Hull – mandolin, vocals
 Ethan Jodziewicz – double bass
 Alison Krauss – backing vocals
 Abigail Washburn – backing vocals
 Rhiannon Giddens – backing vocals
 Béla Fleck – engineer, producer
 Richard Battaglia – engineer
 Richard Dodd – mastering

References

2016 albums
Country albums by American artists
Folk albums by American artists
Rounder Records albums